This is a list of VTV dramas released in 2015.

←2014 - 2015 - 2016→

VTV Special Tet dramas
Since 2015, VTV only produces one Tet drama.

This drama airs from 20:10 to 20:55, 28th-29th & 1st-2nd Tet holiday on VTV1.

VTV1 Weeknight Prime-time dramas

Monday-Tuesday dramas
These dramas air from 20:40 to 21:30, Monday and Tuesday on VTV1.

Starting in March 2015, the time slot 'Monday to Wednesday' was changed to 'Monday and Tuesday'.

Wednesday-Friday dramas
These dramas air from 20:40 to 21:30, Wednesday to Friday on VTV1.

Starting in March 2015, the time slot 'Thursday and Friday' was changed to 'Wednesday to Friday'.

VTV3 Weeknight Prime-time dramas

Monday-Tuesday dramas
These dramas air from 21:15 to 22:10, Monday and Tuesday on VTV3.

Wednesday–Thursday dramas
These dramas air from 21:15 to 22:10, Wednesday and Thursday on VTV3.

VTV3 Rubic 8 dramas
These dramas air from 14:20 to 15:10, Saturday and Sunday on VTV3 as a part of the program Rubic 8.

Non-recurring dramas
This drama was released in the time slot that's originally made for playback dramas. It airs from 08:45 to 09:30, Monday to Friday on VTV6

See also
 List of dramas broadcast by Vietnam Television (VTV)
 List of dramas broadcast by Hanoi Radio Television (HanoiTV)
 List of dramas broadcast by Vietnam Digital Television (VTC)
List of television programmes broadcast by Vietnam Television (VTV)

References

External links
VTV.gov.vn – Official VTV Website 
VTV.vn – Official VTV Online Newspaper 

Vietnam Television original programming
2015 in Vietnamese television